Turtuk is a village and the headquarters of an eponymous community development block in the Indian union territory of Ladakh. It is a small village sandwiched between the Karakorum Range and the Himalayas, and one of the northernmost villages of India, close to the Line of Control between India and Pakistan. Turtuk is situated in the Nubra tehsil of the Leh district, on the banks of the Shyok River. Geographically, the village is in the Baltistan region, which has been under Pakistani administration, except for five villages of the Turtuk block which are part of India. These villages form the only region in India populated by Balti people. Turtuk is known for its fruit, especially apricots.

Turtuk was under Pakistani control until the war of 1971, when the Indian Army captured the village. It is also one of the gateways to the Siachen Glacier.

Geography 

Turtuk lies in the region of Baltistan, a region almost completely controlled by Pakistan. Turtuk is one of five Balti-populated villages under Indian control, the other four being Bogdang, Tyakshi, Chalunkha and Dhothang. It is the largest of the villages and has a claim to being the historical capital of the southern Chorbat section of the Shyok Valley. While Bogdang had been part of Indian-administered Ladakh since 1948, the other four villages were captured by Indian Army during the 1971 war.

History

Brogpa era
The earliest known tribe which inhabited Turtuk were a Dardic tribe, locally known as the Brogpas, who are believed to have migrated from Chilas, a place now in Pakistan. They lived in Turtuk from an unknown time till, mostly probably, the 13th century AD. At some point around the 13th century AD, two warriors named Chuli and Yangdrung, came to Turtuk. They killed the king and eventually mostly of the locals fled Turtuk along the stream and across the mountain, to the villages now called Hanu, Dah and Domkhar.
Right now, majority of the population in Turtuk are the direct descendants of Chuli and Yangdrung.
As time passed on, people from outside came to Turtuk in search of work, bringing in more diversity.
Turtuk is believed to have remained an independent principality till the conquest of Baltistan by the Sikh Empire.

The people of Turtuk were followers of the Bon religion before Islam. Bon rituals can be seen both in the tradition as well as the architecture. Islam came to Turtuk due to the famous Persian Sufi poet and preacher, Syed Ali Shah Hamdani. People in Turtuk, like in other places in Baltistan, practice the Sufi sect Sufis Noorbakshia, named after a disciple of Shah Hamdani, Syed Mohammad Noorbaksh.
But by the nineteenth century, dominant sects from outside, such as Shia, Hanafi and later Wahabi started converting the Sufi Noorbakshia of Baltistan, and the Noorbakshia of Turtuk too. More recently, the Hanafis of Turtuk have also been converted to the more extreme subsets of Sunni.
Right now, only half of the population practices Noorbakshias while the rest practice either Sunni sect or Wahhabi sect.

Yabgo dynasty 
The Chorbat-Khaplu region of Baltistan, including Turtuk, was ruled by the Turkistani Yabgo dynasty for one thousand years. Their rule started when Beg Manthal came to the region from Yarkand in the 9th century and conquered Khaplu. The region was dominated by Buddhism until the arrival of Islamic scholar and poet Mir Sayyid Ali Hamadani in the 13th century.

Dogra dynasty 
The thousand-year Yabgo rule continued until 1834, when Raja Gulab Singh of Jammu, a vassal of the Sikh Empire, conquered the region. After losing kingship, Yabgo Abdullah Khan renamed the family Kacho (Balti for "light weight"), even though the family continued to be a wealthy, powerful family.

After the First Anglo-Sikh War, the British established the princely state of Jammu and Kashmir under Gulab Singh.  Gulab Singh's Dogra dynasty ruled the region until 1947 under the suzerainty of British Raj.

Indo-Pakistan conflicts 

During the Indo-Pakistani War of 1947–1948, the Gilgit Scouts based in Gilgit overthrew the Dogra administration and subsequently invaded the Baltistan region. At the end of that war, Turtuk came under the control of Pakistan along with most of Baltistan.

During the Indo-Pakistani War of 1971, this area was the site of the Battle of Turtuk. India's Ladakh Scouts and Nubra Guards, under the command of Brigadier Udai Singh, entered the village after Pakistani forces had retreated a day earlier. Udai Singh and his second-in-command Major Chewang Rinchen were both honoured with a Maha Vir Chakra for their gallantry and a street is named after Major Rinchen in Leh.

Since 1971 
In 1999, the two countries once again had a major conflict around this area during the Kargil War. There are memorials built in memory of soldiers on Main Road going towards the zero point of the India–Pakistan Line of Control.

The local people are unsure of their loyalties because they have lived under both Pakistani and Indian control, and some of them served in the Pakistan Army before India's take-over. Many of them also have relatives living across the Line of Control. During the Kargil infiltration by Pakistan, some of the local people were suspected to have assisted the infiltrators.

2010 floods

In August 2010, the village of Turtuk was impacted by floods which occurred throughout the entire region of Ladakh.

Tourism in and around Turtuk 

Turtuk was opened to tourists in 2010. The village offers views of the Shyok Valley.

There are a few gompas located on the plateau above the Shyok River and there is an old royal house to see in the village. Turtuk is one of the few places in India where one can witness Balti culture, and one can find a few homestays and guest houses in the village. It is the last major village where tourist activity is allowed before the Line of Control.

Demographics 

According to the 2011 census of India, Turtuk has 384 households. The effective literacy rate (i.e. the literacy rate of population excluding children aged 6 and below) is 82.53%. The residents of Turtuk and its adjoining villages speak the Balti language along with Ladakhi and Urdu.

See also
 Chewang Rinchen

References

Bibliography

External links

Villages in Nubra tehsil